Ursina Haller (born 29 December 1985 in Zernez) is a snowboarder from Switzerland. She competed for Switzerland at the 2010 Winter Olympics in halfpipe, finishing ninth; and at the 2014 Winter Olympics in the same event, finishing twelfth. Haller captured a silver medal at the 2011 FIS Snowboarding World Championships.

References

External links
 FIS-Ski.com – Biography

1985 births
Living people
Swiss female snowboarders
Olympic snowboarders of Switzerland
Snowboarders at the 2010 Winter Olympics
Snowboarders at the 2014 Winter Olympics
21st-century Swiss women